Leila Aman (born 24 November 1977 in Arsi) is an Ethiopian long-distance runner, who specializes in the half marathon and cross-country running.

Achievements

Personal bests
10,000 metres - 32:55.89 min (2003)
Half marathon - 1:11:10 min (2002)
Marathon - 2:27:54 min (2004)

External links

1977 births
Living people
Ethiopian female long-distance runners
African Games bronze medalists for Ethiopia
African Games medalists in athletics (track and field)
Athletes (track and field) at the 2003 All-Africa Games
Ethiopian female cross country runners